Souaibou Marou (born 3 December 2000) is a Cameroonian footballer who plays as a striker for Orlando Pirates Football Club and the Cameroon national team.

Club career
Marou started his career with Cameroonian side Coton Sport, helping them win the league and reach the group stage of the CAF Champions League. In October 2022, he won the Cameroonian men's Ballon d'Or for 2022 as the best Cameroonian footballer of the year. In November 2022, it was reported that Marou had reached an agreement to join South African club Orlando Pirates, though Coton Sport denied any contract had yet been signed.

International career
He was selected for Cameroon's 2022 FIFA World Cup squad. He had earned his first cap for Cameroon hours earlier, and was one of only two domestic-based players to be included in the squad.

References

External links
 

2000 births
Association football forwards
Cameroon international footballers
Cameroonian footballers
Coton Sport FC de Garoua players
Elite One players
Living people
2022 FIFA World Cup players